Dishman is a surname. Notable people with the surname include:

 Chris Dishman (born 1974), American football player
 Cris Dishman (born 1965), American football player and coach
 Glenn Dishman (born 1970), American baseball player and coach
 Jodi W. Dishman (born 1979), American judge